Bindaree is a racehorse who was the winner of the 2002 Grand National when ridden by Jim Culloty and the 2003 Welsh Grand National when partnered by Carl Llewellyn.

Pedigree

1994 racehorse births
Racehorses bred in Ireland
Racehorses trained in the United Kingdom
Thoroughbred family 11-d
Grand National winners
Welsh Grand National winners